Pascal Ducasse  was a Church of Ireland Dean in the first half of the 18th century.

Ducasse was educated at Trinity College, Dublin. He was the incumbent at St Mary, Dublin Dean of Ferns from 1724 to 1728; and Dean of Clogher from 1728 until his death in 1729.

Notes

Deans of Clogher
Deans of Ferns
1729 deaths